The Illinois State Library is the official State Library of Illinois located in Springfield, Illinois. The library has a collection of 5 million items and serves as regional federal documents depository for the state. The library oversees the Talking Book and Braille Service which offers audio and braille library service to Illinois residents with print disabilities or other disabilities. The library maintains the Illinois Center for the Book, the Illinois Digital Archives and the Illinois Veterans History Project.

Building
The original state library was located next to the office of Stephen A. Douglas while he was Secretary of State. It moved into the west wing of the State Capitol's third floor in October 1887. The Illinois State Library is currently housed in the purpose-built library rededicated as the Gwendolyn Brooks State Library in 2003. The library which was designed by Chicago architectural firm Graham, Anderson, Probst and White. Construction took five years to complete and cost just under 36 million dollars when it was complete in 1990.

References

External links
 

1839 establishments in Illinois
Buildings and structures in Springfield, Illinois
Education in Springfield, Illinois
Government agencies established in 1839
Public libraries in Illinois
State agencies of Illinois
State libraries of the United States
Libraries established in 1839